The 1904 Trinity Blue and White baseball team represented the Trinity Blue and White baseball team of Trinity College in the 1904 college baseball season. The team was led by left-handed pitcher Arthur Bradsher's 13 wins. Chadwick led the team in batting average with .338

Schedule and results

Players
Arthur Bradsher - pitcher
Chadwick - catcher
Frank R. Wrenn - catcher
Bynum - first base
Brown - second base
Smith - shortstop
Paul Webb - third base
Howard - outfield
Wooten - center field
N. S. Justus - outfield
Elliott - utility

References

Trinity
Duke Blue Devils baseball seasons
Southern Intercollegiate Athletic Association baseball champion seasons
Duke baseball